György Kurtág (born 19 February 1926) is a Hungarian composer of contemporary classical music and pianist. According to Grove Music Online, with a style that draws on "Bartók, Webern and, to a lesser extent, Stravinsky, his work is characterized by compression in scale and forces, and by a particular immediacy of expression".

He was an academic teacher of piano at the Franz Liszt Academy of Music from 1967, later also of chamber music, and taught until 1993.

Life and career
György Kurtág was born on 19 February 1926 in Lugoj, Romania, which was then the Austro-Hungarian Empire. Born to Hungarian parents, he moved to Budapest in 1946 and became a Hungarian citizen in 1948. There, he began his studies at the Franz Liszt Academy of Music, where he met his wife, Márta Kinsker, as well as composer György Ligeti, who became a close friend. His piano teacher at the academy was Pál Kadosa. He studied composition with Sándor Veress and Ferenc Farkas, chamber music with Leó Weiner, and theory with Lajos Bárdos, and graduated in piano and chamber music in 1951 before receiving his degree in composition in 1955. He married Márta in 1947 and their son György was born in 1954.

Following the Hungarian uprising in 1956, Kurtág's time in Paris between 1957 and 1958 was of critical importance for him. There, he studied with Max Deutsch, Olivier Messiaen, and Darius Milhaud. During this time, however, Kurtág was suffering from severe depression. He has said, "I realized to the point of despair that nothing I had believed to constitute the world was true". Kurtág received therapy from art psychologist Marianne Stein, who encouraged him to work from the simplest musical elements, an encounter that revivified him and strongly stimulated his artistic development. During this time, he also discovered the works of Anton Webern and the plays of Samuel Beckett. The string quartet he composed in 1959 after his return to Budapest marks this crucial turning point; he refers to this piece as his Opus 1. He dedicated it to Stein.

Kurtág worked as a répétiteur at the Bartók Music School (1958–63) and at the National Philharmonia in Budapest (1960–68). In 1967, he was appointed professor of piano and later also of chamber music at the Franz Liszt Academy, where he taught until 1993. During this time his students included Zoltán Kocsis and András Schiff.

Kurtág's first international opportunity came in 1968 when his largest work to date, The Sayings of Peter Bornemisza, was performed by Erika Sziklay and Lóránt Szűcs at the Darmstadt Summer Courses for New Music. The critical response was not positive, and his international recognition began to grow only later with Messages of the Late Miss R.V. Troussova for soprano and chamber ensemble, which had its premiere in Paris in 1981.

Since the early 1990s, he has worked abroad with increasing frequency: he was composer in residence at the Berlin Philharmonic (1993–95) and the Vienna Konzerthaus Society (1995). He then lived in the Netherlands (1996–98), again in Berlin (1998–99) and upon invitation by Ensemble InterContemporain, Cité de la Musique, and Festival d'Automne, in Paris (1999–2001). Kurtág and his wife lived near Bordeaux from 2002 to 2015, when they moved back to Budapest. The couple remained married until Márta's death in October 2019.

Music

According to scholar Rachel Beckles Willson, "Kurtág composes painstakingly and haltingly: in 1985, when he was 59, his output had reached only Op. 23, and several works remained unfinished or had been withdrawn for revision."

Kurtág's compositions are often made up of many very brief movements. Kafka-Fragments, for instance, is an approximately 55-minute song cycle for soprano and solo violin made up of 40 short movements, setting extracts from Franz Kafka's writings, diaries, and letters. Music journalist Tom Service wrote that Kurtág's music "involved reducing music to the level of the fragment, the moment, with individual pieces or movements lasting mere seconds, or a minute, perhaps two." Most extreme of all, his piano piece "Flowers We Are, Mere Flowers", from the eighth volume of Játékok ("Games"), consists of just seven notes. Because of this interest in miniatures, Kurtág's music is often compared to Webern's.

Prior to Stele, Op. 33 (written for the Berlin Philharmonic and Claudio Abbado), Kurtág's compositions were mainly vocal solo and choral music and instrumental music ranging from solo pieces to works for chamber ensembles of increasing size. Since Stele, a number of large-scale compositions have been premiered, such as Messages Op. 34 and New Messages Op. 34a for orchestra and the double concerto …concertante… Op. 42. Kurtág's first opera, Fin de partie, based on Samuel Beckett's Endgame, was premiered at La Scala on 15 November 2018, eight years after the original commission.

Beginning in the late 1980s, Kurtág wrote several works in which the spatial distribution of instruments plays an important role. His composition, … quasi una fantasia… for piano and ensemble, premiered in 1988, is the first piece in which he explores the idea of music that spatially embraces the audience.

Kurtág often held master classes in chamber music, and appeared in concerts together with his wife. The couple played an always-renewing selection of pieces for two- and four-hand piano from Kurtág's ten-volume collection Játékok as well as transcriptions.

Most of Kurtág's music is published by Editio Musica Budapest, some by Universal Edition, Vienna, and some by Boosey & Hawkes, London.

Recognition

Kurtág has received numerous awards, including Officier of the Ordre des Arts et des Lettres in 1985, the Kossuth Award of the Hungarian government for his life achievement in 1973, the Austrian Ehrenzeichen in 1996, and the Ernst von Siemens Music Prize in 1998. He is also a member of the Bavarian Academy of Fine Arts, Munich, and of the Akademie der Künste, Berlin (both since 1987), and was named an Honorary Member of the American Academy of Arts and Letters in 2001. In 2006, he received the Grawemeyer Award for his composition …concertante… Op. 42, for violin, viola and orchestra.

Kurtág received the 2014 BBVA Foundation Frontiers of Knowledge Award in the category of Contemporary Music for, in the view of the jury, its "rare expressive intensity". "The novel dimension of his music", the citation continues, "lies not in the material he uses but in its spirit, the authenticity of its language, and the way it crosses borders between spontaneity and reflection, between formalism and expression."

Invited by Walter Fink, Kurtág was the 14th composer featured in the annual Komponistenporträt of the Rheingau Musik Festival in 2004. The Ensemble Modern and soloists performed his works Opp. 19, 31b and 17. On the occasion of his 80th birthday in February 2006, the Budapest Music Centre honoured him with a festival in his hometown. The same year's editions of Musikfest Berlin, Vienna modern, Holland Festival and Festival d'Automne in Paris dedicated special programmes to Kurtág.

Awards
Erkel Prize in 1955 and 1969
Kossuth Prize (1973)
UNESCO's International Rostrum of Composers (1983)
Music Prize of the Prince Pierre of Monaco Foundation (1993)
International Antonio Feltrinelli Prize (1993)
Composers Award of the State of Austria (1994)
Denis de Rougemot Prize of the European Festivals Association (1994)
Kossuth Prize for Lifetime Achievement (1996)
Austrian Decoration for Science and Art (1997)
Composers Award "Promotion of the European economy" (1998)
Ernst von Siemens Music Prize (1998)
Honorary Prize for Art and Science of the Institute for Advanced Study Berlin (1999)
Pour le Mérite for Science and Art (1999)
Foundation for Contemporary Arts Grants to Artists Award (2000)
Commander with Star of the Order of Merit of the Republic of Hungary (2001)
John Cage Award (2003)
Sonning Award (2003; Denmark)
Grand Cross of Merit of the Republic of Hungary (2006)
University of Louisville Grawemeyer Award for Music Composition (2006; U.S.)
Golden Lion of the Venice Biennale for lifetime achievement (53rd International Festival of Contemporary Music; 2009)
Zürich Festival Prize (2010)
Royal Philharmonic Society Gold Medal (2013)
BBVA Foundation Frontiers of Knowledge Award in Contemporary Music (2014)
Fellow of the American Academy of Arts and Sciences (2015)
 Rolf Schock Prize (2020)

References

Citations

Sources

Further reading

 
 
 Halász, Péter. 1998. György Kurtág. Magyar zeneszerzok 3. Budapest: Mágus Kiadó. .
 
 
 György Kurtág: Great Hungarian Jewish Composer, No Monk article by Benjamin Ivry in "The Forward", including a picture of Márta and György Kurtág at the piano, 6 February 2009
 Varga, Bálint András. 2009. György Kurtág: Three Interviews and Ligeti Homages. Eastman studies in Music. Rochester, NY: University of Rochester Press. .
 Willson, Rachel Beckles. 1998a. "The Fruitful Tension between Inspiration and Design in Kurtág's The Sayings of Péter Bornemisza op.7". Mitteilungen der Paul Sacher Stiftung 11:36–41.
 Willson, Rachel Beckles. 1998b. "Kurtág's Instrumental Music, 1988–98". Tempo, new series, no. 207:15–21.
 Willson. Rachel Beckles. 2004. György Kurtág, The Sayings of Peter Bornemisza, op. 7: A "Concerto" for Soprano and Piano. Landmarks in Music Since 1950. Aldershot, Hants, England; Burlington, VT: Ashgate.

External links
 Profile for György Kurtág on the Boosey & Hawkes website
 Profile for György Kurtág on the Universal Edition website
 
 
 

1926 births
Living people
People from Lugoj
20th-century classical composers
21st-century classical composers
Hungarian classical composers
Hungarian male classical composers
Hungarian Jews
Romanian people of Hungarian-Jewish descent
Jewish classical composers
Recipients of the Pour le Mérite (civil class)
Recipients of the Austrian Decoration for Science and Art
Grand Crosses of the Order of Merit of the Republic of Hungary (civil)
Royal Philharmonic Society Gold Medallists
Franz Liszt Academy of Music alumni
Academic staff of the Franz Liszt Academy of Music
Hungarian classical pianists
Male classical pianists
Composers for piano
Composers for violin
Pupils of Darius Milhaud
Recipients of the Léonie Sonning Music Prize
International Rostrum of Composers prize-winners
Members of the Academy of Arts, Berlin
Jewish classical pianists
Herder Prize recipients
Ernst von Siemens Music Prize winners
Fellows of the American Academy of Arts and Sciences
Members of the Széchenyi Academy of Literature and Arts